"Rock 'n' Roll" is a single released by the British rock band Status Quo in 1981. It was included on the album Just Supposin'. It was written in Ireland by Francis Rossi and Bernie Frost during a stay in the country, and was not originally intended to be recorded by Status Quo themselves.

The song was reprised, in 2014, for the band's thirty-first studio album Aquostic (Stripped Bare). It was featured in the ninety-minute launch performance of the album at London's Roundhouse on 22 October, the concert being recorded and broadcast live by BBC Radio 2 as part of their In Concert series.

Track listing 
A "Rock 'n' Roll" (Rossi/Frost) (4.04)
B1 "Hold You Back" (Rossi/Young/Parfitt) (4.22)
B2 "Backwater" (Parfitt/Lancaster) (4.21)

Charts

Certifications

References 

Status Quo (band) songs
1981 singles
Songs written by Francis Rossi
1981 songs
Vertigo Records singles